Hugo Loetscher (22 December 1929 – 18 August 2009) was a Swiss writer and essayist.

Life 
Loetscher was born and raised in Zürich. He studied philosophy, sociology, and literature at the University of Zürich and the  Sorbonne. At Zürich in 1956 he obtained a doctorate with a work called Die politische Philosophie in Frankreich nach 1945' (Political Philosophy in France after 1945").

Afterwards, he was literature reviewer for the newspaper Neue Zürcher Zeitung and the magazine Weltwoche. From 1958 to 1962 he was a member of the editorial department of the monthly cultural magazine Du and founded the literary supplement Das Wort. From 1964 until 1969 he was feuilleton editor and member of the editorial board of the Weltwoche. He next became a freelance writer.

In the 1960s, Loetscher worked as a reporter in Latin America with his primary focuses being Cuba and Brazil. Later, he also traveled through Southeast Asia. He was writer in residence in 1979/80 at the University of Southern California in Los Angeles where he wrote Herbst in der Grossen Orange. In 1981/82 he was the first holder of the Swiss Chair at the City University of New York. He was guest lecturer at several universities, e.g. in 1988 at the University of Munich in 1999 at the Universidade do Porto and 2008 at the Shanghai International Studies University and the University of California at Berkeley. Loetscher died aged 79 in Zürich.

 Performances 
Hugo Loetscher's works were often based on his traveling experiences; he has been called "the most cosmopolitan Swiss writer". His experiences are reflected in reports including Zehn Jahre Fidel Castro (1969) and narrative works such as Wunderwelt a Brazilian Fairy Tale, and  Eine brasilianische Begegnung (1979). Loetscher's most famous works are Der Immune (1975) and Die Papiere des Immunen (1986), in which he experimented with several literary genres. This variety of genres also reflects itself in other works: fables in Die Fliege und die Suppe (1989), short stories in Der Buckel (2002), columns in Der Waschküchenschlüssel und andere Helvetica (1983), poetry in Es war einmal die Welt (2004). In 2003, he published Lesen statt klettern, a collection of essays on Swiss literature, in which he questioned the traditional image of Switzerland as an Alpine nation. His literary estate is archived in the Swiss Literary Archives in Bern.

Loetscher also had strong interest in visual arts, particularly painting and photography. Besides he made a documentary on politics in Portugal in 1965. He was a close friend of the Swiss painter Varlin (Willy Guggenheim). Varlin painted Loetscher and in 1969, Loetscher edited the first book about Varlin's life and work. As President of the Foundation of Swiss Photography, Loetscher was co-editor of the first history of Swiss photography Photographie in Der Schweiz Von 1840 Bis Heute (1974).

Loetscher was a member of the Swiss Writers´ Association (Schweizerischer Schriftstellerverband), serving as its president from 1986 to 1989. He was also a corresponding member of the Deutsche Akademie für Sprache und Dichtung in Darmstadt.

 The Dürrenmatt affair 
Loetscher was a good friend of the Swiss playwright Friedrich Dürrenmatt. After Dürrenmatt's death, legal action was taken against Loetscher by Dürrenmatt's widow Charlotte Kerr, which was to be later dismissed. The lawsuit's reason: Loetscher wrote a report about Dürrenmatt's abdication in Lesen statt klettern, which Kerr claimed violated her "personal rights". She also criticized details like the folded hands of the laid out corpse or a Stephen King book on Dürrenmatt's bedside table. The description of the funeral had hurt her dignity. She stated that Loetscher was mistaken; Dürrenmatt had been atheist, he would not have folded his hands. Loetscher explained that there had been a drawing that showed Dürrenmatt with hands folded. Kerr supposedly had asked for it and burnt it. He emphasized that he had been a friend of Dürrenmatt for many years. The judges dismissed the case, exonerating Loetscher.

 Awards and honors 
 1964 Charles Veillon prize
 1966 Conrad-Ferdinand-Meyer-Preis
 1972 Literature prize of the city of Zürich
 1985 Schiller  prize of the canton bank of Zurich
 1992 Big Schiller prize of the Swiss Schiller Foundation (de)
 1994 Cruzeiro do Sul for his merits for Brazilian culture

 Works 
 Abwässer, Zürich 1963
 Die Kranzflechterin, Zürich 1964
 Noah, Zürich 1967 (Noah: A Novel of the Boom Times, translated by Samuel P. Willcocks, Seagull Books 2012)
 Zehn Jahre Fidel Castro, Zürich 1969
 Der Immune, Darmstadt u. a. 1975 (Le Déserteur engagé, translated into French by Monique Thiollet, Éditions Belfond, Paris, 1989 ; also 2006 in the Book series Schweizer Bibliothek)
 Die Entdeckung der Schweiz und anderes, Zürich 1976
 Kulinaritäten, Bern 1976 (corresponding with Alice Vollenweider)
 Wunderwelt, Darmstadt u. a. 1979
 Herbst in der Grossen Orange, Zürich 1982
 How many languages does man need?, New York 1982
 Der Waschküchenschlüssel und andere Helvetica, Zürich 1983
 Das Hugo-Loetscher-Lesebuch, Zürich 1984
 Die Papiere des Immunen, Zürich 1986
 Vom Erzählen erzählen, Zürich 1988
 Die Fliege und die Suppe und 33 andere Tiere in 33 anderen Situationen, Zürich 1989
 Der predigende Hahn, Zürich 1992
 Saison, Zürich 1995
 Die Augen des Mandarin, Zürich 1999
 Äs tischört und plutschins, Zürich 2000
 Durchs Bild zur Welt gekommen, Zürich 2001
 Der Buckel, Zürich 2002
 Lesen statt klettern, Zürich 2003
 Es war einmal die Welt, Zürich 2004
 War meine Zeit meine Zeit, Zürich 2009

 Publications as a publisher 
 Manuel Gasser: Welt vor Augen, Frankfurt am Main 1964
 António Vieira: Die Predigt des Heiligen Antonius an die Fische, Zürich 1966
 Varlin: Varlin, Zürich 1969
 Zürich – Aspekte eines Kantons, Zürich 1972
 Photographie in der Schweiz von 1840 bis heute, Teufen 1974; compl. Bern 1992
 Adrien Turel: Bilanz eines erfolglosen Lebens, Frauenfeld 1976
 Hans Falk: Circus zum Thema, Zürich 1981

 Translations 
 Le Corbusier: Von der Poesie des Bauens, Zürich 1957
 Ayi Kwei Armah: Die Schönen sind noch nicht geboren, Olten u. a. 1971
 Walter Sorell: Europas kleiner Riese, München 1972 (with Franz Z. Küttel)
 José Guadelupe Posada: Posada, Zürich 1979

 Literature 
 Romey Sabalius: Die Romane Hugo Loetschers im Spannungsfeld von Fremde und Vertrautheit, New York u. a.: Lang 1995. (= Studies in modern German literature; 72) 
 Jeroen Dewulf: Hugo Loetscher und die «portugiesischsprachige Welt», Bern u. a.: Lang 1999. (= Europäische Hochschulschriften; Reihe 1, Deutsche Sprache und Literatur; 1734) 
 Jeroen Dewulf: In alle Richtungen gehen. Reden und Aufsätze über Hugo Loetscher, Zürich: Diogenes 2005. 
 Jeroen Dewulf: Brasilien mit Brüchen. Schweizer unter dem Kreuz des Südens'', Zürich: NZZ Verlag 2007.

References

External links 
 Literary estate of Hugo Loetscher in the archive database HelveticArchives of the Swiss National Library
 Publications by and about Hugo Loetscher in the catalogue Helveticat of the Swiss National Library
 

 https://web.archive.org/web/20110708032045/http://crazybiswadip.blogspot.com/2007/10/power-balance-for-peace.html Interviewer Biswadip Mitra
 http://escholarship.org/uc/item/5z03g0t4 Hugo Loetscher. In Memoriam

1929 births
2009 deaths
Swiss dramatists and playwrights
Male dramatists and playwrights
Swiss male novelists
Writers from Zürich
20th-century Swiss novelists
20th-century dramatists and playwrights
20th-century male writers